Callahan's Place is a fictional bar with strongly community-minded and empathetic clientele, part of the fictional universe of American writer Spider Robinson. It appears in the Callahan's Crosstime Saloon stories (compiled in the first novel of the same name) along with its sequels Time Travelers Strictly Cash and Callahan's Secret; most of the beloved barflies appear in the further sequels The Callahan Touch, Callahan's Legacy, Callahan's Key, and Callahan's Con, and the computer game.

Synopsis
The bar is run by Mike Callahan.  The regulars are welcoming and willing to listen to any visitor's problems, no matter how strange, but do not snoop if a visitor is unwilling to share.  Strange visitors and unusual events turn up frequently in the stories. Regulars at Callahan's include a talking dog, several extraterrestrials and time travelers, an ethical vampire, a couple of Irish mythological beings, and an obscenity-spewing parrot. The stories make heavy use of puns. Irish whiskeys are the preferred beverage, with Tullamore Dew and Bushmills mentioned in nearly every collection of shorts or novel that references the saloon. The stories make an obvious homage to Fletcher Pratt and L. Sprague de Camp's Tales from Gavagan's Bar and Arthur C. Clarke's Tales from the White Hart.

Lady Sally McGee, the madam of a house of excellent repute (and Mike Callahan's wife), stars in Robinson's Callahan's Lady and Lady Slings the Booze. The regulars at Lady Sally's brothel (where the employees are "artists" and the patrons are "clients") insist on the same empathy and humor as those at Callahan's, and they are just as likely to have fantastic backgrounds. Relatedly, nobody in Lady Sally's is forced into anything they are unwilling to do.

This is the source of Callahan's Law (also known as the Law of Conservation of Pain and Joy): "Shared pain is lessened; shared joy, increased—thus do we refute entropy." Stated another way: "Just as there are Laws of Conservation of Matter and Energy, so there are in fact Laws of Conservation of Pain and Joy. Neither can ever be created or destroyed. But one can be converted into the other."

Characters
 Jake Stonebender: The narrator of the Callahan stories. He has tried to commit suicide after losing his wife and daughter to a car accident which he believes to be his fault. His physician, Doc Webster, saved him and sent him to Callahan's. Jake is a master with his guitar, whom he calls "Lady Macbeth".
 Mike Callahan: The owner of the bar, he is always ready with a drink and a friendly word—though he will also deal quite firmly with anyone who deliberately breaks the bar's rules.
 Sam "Doc" Webster: M.D.; one of the oldest regulars and a master of puns. He works shifts at Smithtown General Hospital.
 Fast Eddie Costigan: The bar's piano player; he jams with Jake and is equipped with a blackjack to discourage nosy questions.
 Long Drink McGonnigle: One of the oldest regulars; a night watchman and also skilled at puns.
 Tom Hauptman: An ex-minister and widower, who was locked away for ten years with his wife in a Latin American banana republic. He believes missing out on ten years of sociological development means he cannot do his job. Callahan offers him the job of assistant bartender after he tells his story.
 Noah Gonzalez: A sergeant in the police force who has a prosthetic leg. He works on the bomb squad. 
 Michael "Mickey" Finn: A humanoid alien who was sent to destroy Earth. Coming to Callahan's makes him want to reconsider; with the assistance of the patrons, he is able to become his own being and save the planet.
 Tommy Janssen: A teenager who comes to Callahan's and gives up his heroin addiction.
 Tom Flannery: One of the former regulars who has eight months to live at the start of the series.
 "Slippery" Joe Maser: He is bigamous; both wives are aware of one another and approve of the arrangement.
 Marty Matthias: Had a gambling issue, but got it fixed after he came to Callahan's.
 Rachel: A woman, which is a rarity in itself at Callahan's. She may also be immortal but is long-lived at the very least.
 Shorty Steinitz: Had his appendix removed by Doc Webster on Callahan's bar. World's worst driver; makes a living restoring antique vehicles.
 Big Beef McCaffrey: Was kicked out of the bar in 1947 by Mike Callahan, without opening the solid oak door first. The door has remained unmended as a reminder. Mentioned, but does not appear in any of the stories.
 Mary Callahan Finn: Mike Callahan's daughter; a blacksmith.  The love of Jake Stonebender's life and the wife of Mickey Finn.
 Ralph Von Wau Wau: Mutant talking dog and regular customer. Regular at Lady Sally's, and a skilled ventriloquist. Often a moral barometer for newcomers: accepting Ralph as a sentient being worthy of respect is considered a final test for acceptance by the Callahan "family".
 Spider Robinson: Author Spider Robinson appeared in one of the Callahan's stories as himself. When a patron asked Jake for "a double", Robinson appeared, as Jake looks exactly like him. Within the context of the series, Robinson lives in a different "ficton" (fictional universe) and has made his living as an author by writing down the stories that Jake tells him of his adventures at Callahan's, whenever the two meet by crossing over into the other's ficton.

Stories
Callahan's Crosstime Saloon contains the following stories, virtually all of which were published in Analog Science Fiction and Fact:

 "The Guy with the Eyes"
 "The Time-Traveler"
 "The Centipede's Dilemma"
 "Two Heads Are Better Than One"
 "The Law of Conservation of Pain"
 "Just Dessert"
 "A Voice Is Heard in Ramah..."
 "Unnatural Causes"
 "The Wonderful Conspiracy"

Time Travelers Strictly Cash contains four Callahan stories and several non-Callahan stories and essays.

Callahan's Secret contains four Callahan stories; there is only Callahan material.

In 1987 Phantasia Press published a 1500-copy hardcover edition of Callahan and Company (ISBN 0-932096-48-4) which reprints the 18 Callahan's stories that appeared in the three previous books.

Callahan's Legacy contains three sections that were not separately published as stories.

All of the later works appeared as individual novels.

Some elements of Callahan's Lady and Lady Slings the Booze have been separately published in Pulphouse.

Other versions
In 1997 Legend Entertainment released a graphic adventure game for the PC (Callahan's Crosstime Saloon), designed by Josh Mandel (of Freddy Pharkas: Frontier Pharmacist fame), based on the series. The player controls Jake Stonebender (narrator of the books) through a series of bizarre adventures. Included in the game are several songs performed by Spider Robinson himself; these can be heard by talking to the pianist in the bar and asking for "one of your specialties".

The series has also been adapted as a setting for the GURPS roleplaying game covering the material of the first three Callahan's books and the first Lady Sally book.

A new visual novel game for PC, by Toge Productions, debuted in January 2020 as Coffee Talk.

See also
 
 Joseph Jorkens

References

External links 
 
 The Official Web Site for Callahan's Place in Second Life
 Callahanian Community Wiki

1977 novels
Ace Books books
Fictional drinking establishments
Science fiction book series